Chandwad Fort  (Chandor fort; चांदवड किल्ला) is located  from Chandwad, Nashik district, of Maharashtra.

History
Chandwad fort was positioned to overlook the trade route from Khandesh to Nashik. It guarded the Chandor pass in the nearby hills. It was built about A.D. 801 by Dridhaprahara, the founder of the Seuna (Yadava) dynasty.

King Bhoj established 52 temples in the nearby region. His daughter, Chandrakala, was married to King Vikram at this fort. The fort was under the control of the Bahmani Sultanate in 14th century. In 1635 the Moghul army took Chandor fort along with Indrai fort. In 1665 Chanwad fort was taken by the Maratha Empire. It was later captured by the Moghul emperor, Aurangzeb. Between 1754 and 1756, Malharrao Holkar induced craftsman to settle in the town by gifting some land. Chandwad then became famous for its brass-work.
On 10 April 1818, after the surrender of Ankai and Tankai forts, the British forces captured Chanwad fort under the detachment headed by Lieutenant-Colonel McDowell. In 1857, during the first war of independence (the rebellion), the 24th Maratha regiment initially took charge of the fort, but had to surrender it to British forces in 1859.

After the opening  of the G.I.P. Railway depot at Manmad in 1861, the bulk of trade line traffic was diverted away from Chandwad.

Gallery

See also 

 List of forts in Maharashtra
 List of forts in India
 Marathi People
 List of Maratha dynasties and states
 Maratha War of Independence
 Military history of India
 List of people involved in the Maratha Empire
 Bahamani Sultanate

References 

Buildings and structures of the Maratha Empire
Forts in Nashik district
16th-century forts in India
Tourist attractions in Nashik district
Former populated places in India
Hiking trails in India
Hiking